The Muppets Take Manhattan is a 1984 American musical comedy-drama film directed by Frank Oz. It is the third theatrical film in The Muppets franchise. In addition to the Muppet performance, the film features special appearances by Art Carney, James Coco, Dabney Coleman, Gregory Hines, Linda Lavin and Joan Rivers. Filmed in New York City during the prior summer, it was released theatrically on July 13, 1984, by TriStar Pictures. A fantasy sequence in the film introduced the Muppet Babies, toddler versions of the lead Muppet characters.

Muppets Take Manhattan was the first film to be directed solely by Oz, who previously co-directed The Dark Crystal with Jim Henson. Excluding the Sesame Street film Follow That Bird, it is the final Muppet film produced before the deaths of Henson and Richard Hunt.

Plot
Following graduating from Danhurst College, The Muppets perform their theatrical production of Manhattan Melodies for their class. Upon the suggestion of taking the show to Broadway, the ensemble proceed with the idea, certain they will become stars instantly. Arriving in Manhattan, the group meet producer Martin Price, but the police arrive and reveal he is a wanted con artist before arresting him. The Muppets try other producers to no avail, leading to their morale and finances taking a nosedive. Thinking they are becoming a burden to Kermit when he snaps at them, the rest of the Muppets agree to go their separate ways for new occupations, though Miss Piggy secretly remains in Manhattan to keep an eye on Kermit. Though disappointed by the development, Kermit vows to make the show a hit and enlists the assistance of diner owner Pete, his aspiring fashion designer daughter Jenny, and the diner's staff of rats led by Rizzo.

Kermit's attempts to promote fail, and, in the form of post, learns that Scooter house manages a Cleveland, Ohio movie theater; Fozzie joins some other bears in hibernating within the forests of Maine where he has a hard time sleeping; Dr. Teeth and the Electric Mayhem have a gig in Pittsburgh, Pennsylvania, performing in a retirement home; Gonzo and Camilla are trying to make a successful water skiing act in Michigan; and Rowlf is working at a dog kennel in Delaware. While in Central Park, Jenny comforts Kermit about his losses, while an envious Piggy watches. Distracted, Piggy's purse is stolen but she takes chase and, in the ensuing chaos, reunites with Kermit, and takes a job at Pete's.

Kermit receives a letter from producer Bernard Crawford, who is interested in the musical. However, the letter was actually written by his son Ronnie, who is struggling to prove himself as a producer and believes that Manhattan Melodies is good. Bernard himself is hesitant but agrees. Thrilled, Kermit heads back to the diner but is so distracted that he walks into oncoming traffic and is struck by a passing car.

Piggy summons the rest of the Muppets back to New York, only to discover that Kermit has disappeared. At the hospital, Kermit has lost memory of his life. He makes his way to Madison Avenue where he meets a trio of frogs, Bill, Gill and Jill, who work in advertising and offer him a job. He takes the job and begins going by "Phil". The rest of the Muppets search for Kermit. Bill, Gill, Jill and Kermit end up at Pete's diner where Kermit's friends recognize him when he unknowingly plays the show's opening number. At the Biltmore Theatre on opening night, the Muppets try to help Kermit remember. When Kermit laughs at the idea of being in love with Piggy, she karate chops him, restoring his memory. As they hurriedly prepare for the opening number, the Muppets ask Kermit if their new friends can watch from backstage. Kermit, realizing the show needs more Muppets, suggests that the Madison Avenue frogs, the dogs, the bears, the chickens and others become supernumerary actors.

The show is a smash hit, culminating in what is intended to be a staged wedding between Kermit and Piggy's characters, only for a real minister to appear in lieu of Gonzo. With all of the Muppets, the Sesame Street characters and Uncle Traveling Matt from Fraggle Rock present, the show ends as is.

Cast

Live-action cast
 Louis Zorich as Pete, the owner and chef of Pete's Diner.
 Juliana Donald as Jenny, Pete's kind daughter, a waitress and aspiring fashion designer.
 Lonny Price as Ronnie Crawford, Bernard's son and an aspiring Broadway producer.
 Cheryl McFadden as Nancy, the secretary to Martin Price.
 Graham Brown as Mr. Wrightson, a stuffy client at the kennel where Rowlf briefly works.

Muppets performers and voice cast

 Jim Henson as Kermit the Frog, Rowlf, Dr. Teeth, Swedish Chef, Waldorf, The Muppet Newsman, Baby Kermit, Baby Rowlf and Ernie 
 Frank Oz as Miss Piggy, Fozzie, Animal, Sam Eagle, Baby Piggy, Baby Fozzie, Bert and Cookie Monster 
 Jerry Nelson as Camilla, Lew Zealand, Floyd, Crazy Harry, Pops and Bear 
 Richard Hunt as Scooter, Janice, Statler, Baby Scooter and Beaker
 Dave Goelz as Gonzo, Chester the Rat, Bill the Frog, Zoot, a Penguin, Jim the Dog, Baby Gonzo, Beauregard (scenes deleted) and Dr. Bunsen Honeydew 
 Steve Whitmire as Rizzo the Rat, Gill the Frog and Bear
 Bruce Edward Hall as Masterson the Rat and Beth Bear
 Kathryn Mullen as Jill the Frog
 Karen Prell as Yolanda the Rat and Frank the Dog 
 Brian Muehl as Tatooey the Rat

Cameo guest stars
 Frances Bergen as Mr. Winesop's receptionist
 Art Carney as Bernard Crawford, a renowned theatrical producer and Ronnie's father.
 James Coco as Mr. Skeffington, a man who leaves his dog at the kennel where Rowlf works.
 Dabney Coleman as Murray Plotsky, a con artist posing as a theatrical producer named Martin Price.
 Elliott Gould as a police officer at Pete's Diner. Gould previously appeared as a cameo in The Muppet Movie.
 Gregory Hines as a roller skater whose skates are borrowed by Miss Piggy.
 Dr. Cyril Jenkins as the minister performing Kermit and Miss Piggy's wedding.
 Mayor Edward I. Koch as himself
 John Landis as Leonard Winesop, a known theatrical producer.
 Linda Lavin as Kermit's doctor, who diagnoses his amnesia.
 David Lazer as a customer at Sardi's
 Liza Minnelli as herself
 Joan Rivers as Eileen, a perfume saleswoman who works with Piggy.
 Brooke Shields as a Pete's Diner patron
 Vincent Sardi Jr. as himself

Production
Under the working title of Muppet Movie III, Jim Henson initially planned to film in late spring 1983. Having directed The Great Muppet Caper and The Dark Crystal back-to-back, Henson decided to serve as executive producer while David Lazer serves as producer. Upon selecting fellow Muppet performer and The Dark Crystal co-director Frank Oz to handle directorial duties, Henson stated, "I was looking at the year ahead and I thought my life was very busy and I thought maybe it was a time to have Frank directing one of these."

The first draft titled The Muppets: The Legend Continues, written by Muppet Caper screenwriters Jay Tarses and Tom Patchett, was dismissed by Oz for being "way too over jokey". After being given Henson's encouragement to tinker with the script, Oz revised the screenplay in an effort to develop the "oomph of the characters and their relationships". Once the script was completed and the sets were built, special consultant David Misch was brought in to write cameos for some guest star appearances. Originally, this list of guest stars contained Dustin Hoffman, Steve Martin, Michael Jackson, Lily Tomlin, Richard Pryor and Laurence Olivier, to name a few. According to Misch, Hoffman was going to play a Broadway producer and planned to do an imitation of film producer Robert Evans (The Godfather), which he later did in the film Wag the Dog. However, at the last minute, Hoffman decided that the role could be offensive to Evans and dropped out, following which all the other big names left as well. Because of the dropped cameos, Misch and Oz ended up rewriting most of the dialogue.

Music
Jeff Moss was nominated for an Academy Award for Best Original Song Score for the music he composed for The Muppets Take Manhattan, but lost to Purple Rain by Prince.

The Muppets Take Manhattan: The Original Soundtrack contains all of the songs written by Jeff Moss and prominent score cues composed by Ralph Burns from the film, as well as several portions of dialogue and background score. The album reached No. 204 on Billboard's Bubbling Under the Top LPs chart and was nominated for a Grammy Award for Best Recording for Children, but lost to Shel Silverstein's audio edition of Where the Sidewalk Ends.

This is the only Muppet film soundtrack that has not been released on CD. However, three tracks from the album can be found on the 2002 compilation album The Muppet Show: Music, Mayhem, and More. A new version of "Together Again (Again)" was performed in the 2014 film Muppets Most Wanted and its soundtrack.

Release

Marketing
The Muppets Take Manhattan was adapted by Marvel Comics in 1984, as the 68-page story in Marvel Super Special #32. The adaptation was later re-printed into a three-issue limited series, released under Marvel's Star Comics imprint (November 1984 – January 1985). The film's script was adapted into comic form by writer Stan Kay with art by Dean Yeagle and Jacqueline Roettcher. Unlike in the film, the comic depicts Gonzo, Floyd Pepper, Animal, Janice, Dr. Teeth, and Zoot in their customary outfits from The Muppet Show.

In addition, a book-and-record set of the film was released in the form of a vinyl record through the Muppet Music Records label.

Home media
Unlike Henson's previous films (The Muppet Movie, The Great Muppet Caper, and The Dark Crystal), The Muppets Take Manhattan was originally released by TriStar Pictures and not produced by ITC Films, mainly because ITC was suffering from extreme financial difficulties at the time. Therefore, unlike the previous films, the distribution rights to The Muppets Take Manhattan did revert to The Jim Henson Company in 1998, but did not revert to The Walt Disney Company in 2004. Because of this, it is one of three Muppet films (along with Muppets from Space and the direct-to-video feature Kermit's Swamp Years) whose home video distribution rights are still controlled by Sony Pictures, and not the Walt Disney Studios.

The Muppets Take Manhattan was first released on VHS and the now defunct CED Videodisc format by CBS/Fox Video in 1985, which then reissued it in 1991, followed by a release from Columbia TriStar Home Video and Jim Henson Home Entertainment on June 1, 1999. The 1999 VHS contained a slightly edited cut from previous versions, possibly derived from the TV broadcast version. Cuts include removal of the audio from the TriStar logo, the scenes of Animal shouting "Bad man!" to Mr. Price, removal of the words "Oh my God" in one scene, and scenes with Miss Piggy hitting the purse snatcher.

A DVD version was released on June 5, 2001 with the cuts from the 1999 VHS version restored. A Blu-ray edition was released on August 16, 2011, and contains the same bonus features as the DVD.

Reception

Box office
On its opening weekend, The Muppets Take Manhattan grossed $4.4 million, ranking at fifth place at the box office. The film ultimately earned $25.5 million in the United States and Canada, placing it as the second highest-grossing G-rated film of 1984 (behind a re-issue of Walt Disney Productions' Pinocchio).

Critical reaction
Roger Ebert of the Chicago Sun-Times gave the film three stars (out of four), stating in his review that "the plot of [the] movie has been seen before." However, Ebert went on to say that just about everything in the film was enjoyable and that Kermit finally solves his long-lasting identity crisis. Gene Siskel of the Chicago Tribune gave the film  stars (out of four) writing it was "a most enjoyable backstage musical, culminating, as you probably have heard, with a wedding ceremony between you-know-who and you-know-who." Variety positively stated: "The Muppets Take Manhattan is a genuinely fun confection of old-fashioned entertainment that will appeal to both children and their parents, weaned on Henson's syndicated tv series." Sheila Benson of the Los Angeles Times, who expressed disappointment in The Great Muppet Caper, felt the Muppets "have found their footing adroitly now; the emphasis is back on real values and identifiable emotions." In his annual Movie Guide, Leonard Maltin gave the film a three star rating (out of four) as well citing that the film is an "enjoyable outing with bouncy songs, [with a] nice use of N.Y.C. locations."

Gary Arnold of The Washington Post described the film as being "progressively lackluster", finding the Muppets' disbandment to be a "misbegotten juncture that the script proceeds to unravel, losing a unified storytelling thread while keeping tabs on the scattered troupe until the inevitable reunion." He further felt the film lacked "rousing musical numbers", in which he blamed Henson and Oz for pinning "everything on a poorly calculated and staged marital spectacular, as Miss Piggy finally cons Kermit to the altar -- a terminally sappy bad idea to begin with." Vincent Canby of The New York Times wrote: "This may be only an impression, based on the fact that the past always looks greener than the present, but The Muppets Take Manhattan seems just a little less extraordinaire than the two other features."

Review aggregator Rotten Tomatoes reports that 83% of 24 critics have given the film a positive review, with an average rating of 6.9/10. The site's consensus stated that "if it's not quite as sharp as The Muppet Movie, The Muppets Take Manhattan is still a smart, delightfully old-fashioned tale that follows the formula established by the first two movies -- a madcap adventure assisted by a huge group of human stars." On Metacritic, the film has a score of 64 out of 100 based on 9 critics, indicating "generally favorable reviews".

Abandoned follow-up series
On February 7, 2019, it was announced that Once Upon a Time showrunners Edward Kitsis and Adam Horowitz were working with actor Josh Gad on a TV series titled Muppets Live Another Day, set after the film's events, for Disney+. The series was to focus on the Muppets, who disbanded some time after the film's events, reuniting after Rowlf disappears. However, on September 9, 2019, it was announced that the series had been scrapped due to creative differences following an executive change at The Muppets Studio.

References

External links

 
 
 
 
 
 
 

1980s children's adventure films
1980s English-language films
1980s musical comedy films
1984 films
American children's adventure films
American children's comedy films
American children's musical films
American musical comedy films
Films about amnesia
Films about weddings in the United States
Films adapted into comics
Films directed by Frank Oz
Films set in Manhattan
Films shot in New York City
The Jim Henson Company films
The Muppets films
TriStar Pictures films
1980s American films